Homoeosoma stenopis is a species of snout moth in the genus Homoeosoma. It was described by Alfred Jefferis Turner in 1904. It is found in Australia.

References

Moths described in 1904
Phycitini